This list reports the notable citizens, civil and political activists, students, journalists, lawyers and athletes who have been arrested in Iran during the ongoing protests sparked by the death of Mahsa Amini in September 2022. There is no clear information about the whereabouts and the situation of many of them.

The arrests come on top of severe internet restrictions and blocking of apps including Instagram and WhatsApp, which activists say is aimed at preventing details of the protests from reaching the outside world.

This list is organized in alphabetic order of the surnames.

Detainees

See also 
 Human rights in Iran

References

Mahsa Amini protests
Women, Life, Freedom